Diogo Rafael dos Santos Almeida (born 8 September 2000) is a Portuguese professional footballer who plays as a forward for Mafra in Liga Portugal 2.

Professional career
Almeida made his professional debut for Paços de Ferreira in a 0–0 (5–4) Taça da Liga penalty shootout win over Estoril on 3 August 2019.

References

External links
 
 
 

2000 births
Living people
Portuguese footballers
Portugal youth international footballers
F.C. Paços de Ferreira players
S.L. Benfica B players
Primeira Liga players
Association football forwards
Sportspeople from Viseu District